Bratków may refer to the following places in Poland:
Bratków, Lower Silesian Voivodeship (south-west Poland)
Bratków, Łódź Voivodeship (central Poland)